Boboluszki  (Czech Bobolusky, German Boblowitz, 1936-1945 Hedwigsgrund) is a village in the administrative district of Gmina Branice, within Głubczyce County, Opole Voivodeship, in south-western Poland, close to the Czech border.

References

Boboluszki